A.P. Green Chapel is a nondenominational chapel serving the University of Missouri in Columbia.  Today it is available for wedding ceremonies, initiation ceremonies and other such events through the Missouri Student Union.

History 

Attached to the University's Memorial Union, it was constructed in 1961 as a gift from prominent manufacturer Allen Percival Green (1875–1956).  The Chapel was one of many gifts given across Missouri by the Allen P. and Josephine B. Green Foundation.  The Chapel was designed by architect O. W. Stiegmeyer of St. Louis and built by the B. D. Simon Construction Company of Columbia.  It was  dedicated by the Greens on October 11, 1959, with four goals in mind.

For  meditation and prayer by individuals
For programs during Religion-in-Life Week
For devotional services of a special and occasional nature by any group with University affiliations, with the understanding that such services by any one group may not be regularly recurring
For memorial services, funerals, or weddings of persons with University affiliations

A small detail of the chapel that often goes unnoticed can be seen on the back pew. A small crest is engraved underneath the left side of the pew bearing the symbol of Mr. Green's manufacturing company.  The symbol is composed of two mirroring letter V's, resembling an X.

References 

University of Missouri campus
University and college chapels in the United States
Towers in Missouri
Religious buildings and structures in Missouri
1961 establishments in Missouri
Buildings and structures completed in 1961
Religion in Columbia, Missouri